The National Association of Presort Mailers (NAPM) is a US trade group which represents major mailers and third-party presorted mailing firms.

External links 
 Official website

Trade associations based in the United States
United States Postal Service